Dominique Pinon (born 4 March 1955) is a French actor. He is known for appearing in films directed by Jean-Pierre Jeunet, often playing eccentric or grotesque characters.

Early life and education
Dominique Pinon was born in Saumur, Maine-et-Loire, France on 4 March 1955. After studying at the Faculty of Arts of Poitiers, Dominique Pinon moved to Paris and enrolled at the Cours Simon.

Career

A prolific screen and theatre actor with many tens of titles to his credit, Pinon has appeared most predominantly in French films, but also in works produced and shot in England, Germany, Italy, Russia, Spain, and the United States. Pinon has become known for playing eccentric or grotesque characters.

In film
In 1981, Jean-Jacques Beineix gave Pinon his start in cinema with the movie Diva. He has had further roles in the films of Jean-Pierre Jeunet and Jean-Jacques Beineix. He has also appeared in three films by British horror director Johannes Roberts. Pinon appears in The Bridge of San Luis Rey (in French, Le Pont du roi Saint-Louis). Adapted from a short work by Thornton Wilder by the Irish director Mary McGuckian, Pinon acts in this period piece, which was poorly reviewed and had an ensemble cast (also including Robert De Niro, Harvey Keitel, Gabriel Byrne, Kathy Bates, F. Murray Abraham, and Geraldine Chaplin). He also appears in Álex de la Iglesia's 2008 The Oxford Murders with Elijah Wood, John Hurt, and Leonor Watling.

In theater
In the theatre, he has appeared in the plays of Gildas Bourdet, Jorge Lavelli, and Valère Novarina.

Awards and recognition
Pinon received the Molière Award for Best Actor in 2004. In 2011, he was the president of the jury for the second Festival International du Film fantastique d'Audincourt. He has beens an officer of the Ordre des Arts et des Lettres since 2014.

Works

On stage

Filmography

Other works

Further reading

 Biography of Pinon at Allociné (in French)
 Biography of Pinon at Allociné (in machine English)
 Films of Jean-Pierre Jeunet at Allociné (in French)
  Report of the grand prix audio, Contemporary category a 2015 audiobook award, going to "Caprice de la reine" by Jean Echenoz, as read by Dominique Pinon.

References

External links
 

1955 births
Living people
French male film actors
French male stage actors
University of Poitiers alumni
French expatriates in Spain
Expatriate actors in Spain
People from Saumur
Officiers of the Ordre des Arts et des Lettres